Ornarantia is a genus of moths in the family Choreutidae.

Species

Ornarantia biferana (Walker, 1863)
Ornarantia bigerana (Walker, 1863)
Ornarantia canofusana (Walker, 1863)
Ornarantia chorica (Meyrick, 1926)
Ornarantia cinctipes (Felder & Rogenhofer, 1875)
Ornarantia contrariana (Walker, 1863)
Ornarantia contubernalis (Zeller, 1877)
Ornarantia dyari Busck, 1900
Ornarantia gradella Walsingham, 1914
Ornarantia immarginata Walsingham, 1914
Ornarantia laciniosella Busck, 1914
Ornarantia meratella Busck, 1914
Ornarantia ophiodesma (Meyrick, 1915)
Ornarantia rimulalis (Zeller, 1875)
Ornarantia scenophora (Meyrick, 1922)
Ornarantia tristis (Felder & Rogenhofer, 1875)
Ornarantia velatana (Walker, 1863)
Ornarantia xutholopa Walsingham, 1914

External links
choreutidae.lifedesks.org

Choreutidae